Man in a Suitcase is a British television private eye thriller series produced by Lew Grade's ITC Entertainment. It originally aired in the United Kingdom on ITV from 27 September 1967 to 17 April 1968. ABC broadcast episodes of Man in a Suitcase in the United States from 3 May to 20 September 1968.

Origins and overview
Man in a Suitcase was effectively a replacement for Danger Man, whose production had been curtailed when its star Patrick McGoohan had decided to create his own series, The Prisoner. Many of the Danger Man production crew moved over to Man in a Suitcase, which was initially to be titled McGill after its lead character. As with several ITC productions, the series was to use an American star in an attempt to boost the show's sales in the US. An early choice was Jack Lord, but the part of McGill eventually went to Richard Bradford, a method actor who was spotted after appearing opposite Marlon Brando in the 1966 movie The Chase. The series was created by Richard Harris and Dennis Spooner. Neither writer had any further involvement with the series—Spooner was mostly involved with producing his own series, The Champions—and the lead character changed somewhat from their original conception of a hard-boiled, wise-cracking detective.

McGill was a former US intelligence agent, who had been forced to resign from the service six years before the opening episode, having been practically accused of treason. Unable to clear his name or return to the US, McGill makes ends meet by working as a travelling private detective and bounty hunter based in Britain, living out of his suitcase (hence the title). His cases generally took him to different parts of Europe, and on a couple of occasions to Africa.

The theme tune was composed by Ron Grainer and it was later reused as the theme for Chris Evans' entertainment show TFI Friday. The incidental music was supplied by Albert Elms.

Story and style
In the pilot episode, "Man from the Dead", the reason for McGill's disgrace is revealed. During an assignment six years earlier, he discovered that a top western scientist called LeFarbe was preparing to defect to the USSR. Though he planned to intercept the defector, he was ordered to stand down by his superior Harry Thyssen. Shortly afterwards, LeFarbe went over to the Soviets. Accused of complicity in the defection, McGill was unable to call on Thyssen to clear his name, as his superior had been drowned in a sailing accident, and he was forced to resign from the service amid much negative publicity. Six years on, McGill discovers that Thyssen is still alive, his death having been faked. He is now working as a sailor on a Russian freighter, in which capacity he acts as a courier of secret information from LeFarbe. The scientist is in fact a double agent, now highly placed in the Soviet scientific community to provide valuable intelligence. As McGill's diligence nearly blew open this important operation, his superiors had no choice but to make him a very public scapegoat, to maintain the illusion of the LeFarbe defection as genuine. On the series's first broadcast on ATV Midlands "Man from the Dead" was screened as the sixth episode; "Brainwash", thought to be a stronger tale, was in fact broadcast first.

Building on this foundation, Man in a Suitcase is a series very much about betrayal, mistrust and deceit. Because of his unofficial, semi-legal status, McGill often finds himself being hired by unscrupulous clients and unwittingly used for criminal ends, or set up as a fall guy. On several occasions, characters from his past with US intelligence draw him into dangerous situations; and he can also be blackmailed or tricked into participating in espionage missions, as he is the perfect deniable operative. A number of the series writers were new to ITC, and this resulted in a show that was markedly different from the usual light-hearted adventure and espionage fantasy of such series. It highlighted character-based drama grounded in a cynical view of the real world, making it more akin to the spy novels of John le Carré and Len Deighton.

As developed by Bradford, the characterisation of McGill is complex. As a man who feels betrayed by life and his country, he can appear outwardly as surly, moody and uncommunicative, but this masks a sensitive interior. McGill feels compassion for those who were the victims in his cases, and would try to help them, often at his own cost.

The level of violence portrayed in the show was unprecedented for an ITC series. This was partly because of Bradford's concerns that the stories and characters should remain real. Unlike most TV action heroes of the time, McGill would not get cleanly knocked unconscious and then recover without effect; Bradford took great pains to depict the character as wounded and concussed. In addition to beatings, McGill is several times shot and stabbed, and ends more than one episode recovering in hospital.

One gimmick of the show is that McGill's first name is never revealed. Some close friends instead know him as "Mac".  Note, though, in the episode 'Who's Mad Now?', McGill goes to pick up his mail, and one of the letters is clearly addressed to "R. McGill Esq."

As with the other ITC series of the era, although the plots took McGill far and wide around the world, in reality the majority of filming was done in and around Pinewood Studios. The series was unusual in its use of night-time filming (as opposed to the day-for-night approach common at the time). Actual locations included London's South Bank and White City Stadium in "Man from the Dead", Albert Bridge, London in "The Bridge" and Kingston upon Thames in "Day of Execution", the latter a setting for a remarkable (for its time) night-time car chase.

Cast
Richard Bradford is the only regular actor in the series. Guest stars include some ITC regulars such as Roger Delgado, Stuart Damon, Jane Merrow, Basil Dignam, Ed Bishop, Anton Rodgers, George Sewell, Philip Madoc, and John Gregson; and such actors as Barbara Shelley, Rodney Bewes, Felicity Kendal, Rupert Davies, Colin Blakely, Ray McAnally, Bernard Lee, Jacqueline Pearce, Edward Fox, Sam Kydd and Donald Sutherland.

Episode list
Airdate and episode order is for ATV Midlands; other ITV regions varied date and order.

The two-part story "Variation on a Million Bucks" was edited into a feature film for theatrical release in Europe, entitled To Chase a Million.

DVD and Blu-ray
The entire series has been released on DVD in Britain in a box-set by Network. There are eight discs (Region 2 UK). Extras consist of commercial bumpers, both US and UK, a music-only track on one or two episodes, and an interview with series star Richard Bradford where he sometimes vehemently describes the working conditions and former producers of the show.

Prior to this, Carlton Video had released a single disc with the first two episodes.

The series is also available in Australia from Umbrella Entertainment in a box set.

Acorn Media released both seasons in two four-disc, Region 1 box sets in 2010.

In October 2017 Network DVD announced that the series was to be issued on Blu-ray.

Other media

Writer Rodney Marshall and television historian Matthew Lee produced the first critical guide to the series in 2015.

Notes

References

External links
 
 Man in a Suitcase at BFI Screen Online

1960s British drama television series
1967 British television series debuts
1968 British television series endings
Espionage television series
Films directed by John Glen
Television series by ITC Entertainment
ITV television dramas
Television series produced at Pinewood Studios